Shanghai has an expansive grade-separated highway and expressway network consisting of 16 municipal express roads, 10 provincial-level expressways, and 8 national-level expressways. Three municipal expressways and four provincial-level expressways are also under construction.

Municipal express roads
Most municipal express roads are found in the inner districts of Shanghai, including several elevated highways which run directly above surface-level roadways. In Chinese, these expressways are literally termed city high-speed roadways, and their maximum speed is typically . These are still considered expressways or controlled-access highways because of the presence of ramps, grade-separated junctions, and the absence of traffic lights. Most of these expressways are elevated and run above a lower-speed roadway. The Inner Ring Road is a beltway, while the Middle Ring Road, once fully constructed, will also be a beltway.

Primary express roads
These are primary express roads that form a major backbone of expressways within the city core. Of these four, the Inner Ring, North–South, and Yan'an Elevated Roads form a 申 (a Chinese abbreviation for Shanghai) shape. The Middle Ring forms a second orbital surrounding the Inner Ring Elevated Road, but is not yet fully complete.

Auxiliary express roads
These are other express roads that serve as part of the municipal expressway network. Of these, six belong to the Hongqiao Comprehensive Transportation Hub, a network of municipal expressways serving Shanghai Hongqiao Railway Station and Shanghai Hongqiao International Airport.

Provincial expressways
Designations for provincial-level and federal-level expressways in Shanghai had the letter prefix A before the number of the expressway. Starting at the Yingbin Expressway, which was designated the number 1, the numbers increased clockwise around the city. For ring expressways, the designations A20, A30, A40, etc., were used. For expressways connecting to other provinces which already had national designations (beginning with the letter G), designations with the letter A were attached.

In August 2009, Shanghai replaced its system of naming expressways with the prefix A with the letter prefix S, in order to conform to the standard designations for provincial-level highways within China. The S means Shengdao, or provincial-level roads. The letter prefix A was abolished.

National expressways
National highways and expressways in Shanghai both have the prefix G, an abbreviation for Guodao, which literally means National roads. It is important to note that both grade-separated, controlled-access expressways and normal at-grade highways both have the prefix G. Only the national-level expressways are mentioned here. National-highways which are at grade and not controlled-access are also found in Shanghai, and these include  G204,  G312,  G318, and  G320. Expressways also have green-coloured signs while their highway counterparts have red-coloured signs.

Yangtze River fixed crossing
Shanghai has one bridge-tunnel crossing spanning the Yangtze Delta to the north of the city.  The G40 Shanghai–Xi'an Expressway follows the Shanghai Yangtze River Tunnel from Pudong to Changxing Island, and then over the Shanghai Yangtze River Bridge from Changxing to Chongming Island and finally via the Chongming–Qidong Yangtze River Bridge from Chongming to Qidong in Jiangsu Province on the north bank of the river. A second fixed crossing is planned to the west of this bridge, and will become part of the S7 Shanghai–Chongming Expressway.

References